Jiminy Cricket is the Disney version of the "Talking Cricket" (Italian: Il Grillo Parlante), a fictional character created by Italian writer Carlo Collodi for his 1883 children's book The Adventures of Pinocchio, which Walt Disney adapted into the animated film Pinocchio in 1940. Originally an unnamed, minor character in Collodi's novel who is killed by Pinocchio before returning as a ghost, he was transformed for the Disney adaptation into a comical and wisecracking partner who accompanies Pinocchio on his adventures, having been appointed by the Blue Fairy (known in the book as the "Fairy with Turquoise Hair") to serve as Pinocchio's official conscience. In the film, he sings "When You Wish Upon a Star", the Walt Disney Company's signature song.

Jiminy Cricket's appearance differs somewhat from that of actual crickets, which range from black to light brown and have long antennae and six legs; Jiminy Cricket has short antennae, a greenish-brown hue, and four limbs; like most Disney characterizations, he is bipedal. He dresses in the manner of a 19th- or early 20th-century gentleman, characteristically wearing a blue top hat and a white dress shirt with an orange vest over a black jacket along with a yellow tie and khaki slacks with blue and yellow spats and carrying a burgundy umbrella. Since his debut in Pinocchio, he has become an iconic Disney character, making numerous other appearances, including in Fun and Fancy Free (1947) as the host and in Mickey's Christmas Carol (1983) as the Ghost of Christmas Past.

Origin of name
"Jiminy", along with variants "Jiminy Christmas" and "Jiminy cricket" have been used as minced oaths for "Jesus Christ" since at least 1803. "Jiminy Cricket!" was uttered in Pinocchios immediate Disney predecessor, 1937's Snow White and the Seven Dwarfs by the seven dwarfs. It also occurs in the 1938 Mickey Mouse cartoon "Brave Little Tailor".

Creation
The character was designed by Ward Kimball, who had been very disappointed and was about to leave the Disney studio when much of the work he did for Snow White and the Seven Dwarfs was cut from the final version of that film. However, Walt Disney persuaded him to stay by giving him the assignment of supervising the animation of Jiminy Cricket.

Voice actors
Jiminy Cricket has been voiced in English by six actors. He was originally performed by singer Cliff Edwards, who voiced the character for Disney through the 1960s and sang Jiminy's most famous song, "When You Wish Upon a Star". After Edwards' death, Clarence Nash voiced him for a brief period of time, until 1973, when Eddie Carroll took over the role as Jiminy's voice actor. Carroll played the role for 37 years, until his death in 2010. Actor Hal Smith voiced Jiminy in the Pinocchio Read-Along Storybook in 1992. Actor Phil Snyder next voiced Jiminy for the Kingdom Hearts video game series until his retirement from voice acting in 2014 to concentrate on his career teaching. Actor Joe Ochman took over the role at that time, beginning with Kingdom Hearts HD 2.5 Remixs installment of Kingdom Hearts: Recoded, and he has been the voice of Jiminy since 2014.

Raphael Sbarge voices Jiminy in Once Upon a Time where he portrays him in human form as well. In the Italian dub of the Disney adaptation, Jiminy Cricket was voiced by Carlo Romano. In French he is voiced by Roger Carel. In the live action adaption, he is voiced by Joseph Gordon-Levitt.

After Pinocchio

In media
After Pinocchio, Jiminy appeared in Fun and Fancy Free as the host of the cartoon segments. The character also hosted a one-hour segment ABC Radio special in 1947, improbably concerning the year 1960. He also hosted many Disney television specials. Additionally, in a recurring segment of the children's television series The Mickey Mouse Club, he taught a generation how to spell "encyclopedia".

At theme parks
Jiminy Cricket also appears at the Walt Disney Parks and Resorts as a meetable character, and in Pinocchio's Daring Journey, a dark ride themed to the movie from which he originated, found at three of the Disney parks worldwide (i.e. in California, Japan and France).

A minuscule version of him can also be spotted on the It's a Small World ride in Disneyland California.

1950s–1980s

In the 1950s–1970s, Jiminy Cricket appeared in four series of educational films aimed at grade-school audiences. In the I'm No Fool series, he advised children how to steer clear of dangerous traffic, sharp objects, strangers, exposed electrical lines, and so forth. Several of those series were first shown on The Mickey Mouse Club from 1955 through 1959.

The second series called You, teaches about the human body with the refrain "You are a human animal". This, too, was originally shown on the "Mickey Mouse Club". The third series, "The Nature Of Things", combined live-action and animation, and the fourth series was called "Encyclopedia". In the 1950s, on The Mickey Mouse Club, he also sang two related songs related to safety:  "Stop, Look, And Listen", and "Safety First".

On Disneyland Records, Jiminy Cricket sang the yuletide song "Kris, Kris Kringle (With A Tingle-Ingle-Ingle)" in a vaudevillian Tin Pan Alley style, first singing the song straight, and the second time speaking half of the song in rhythm. He ended the song by wishing everyone a "Merry Christmas".

In 1988, he made a brief cameo in Who Framed Roger Rabbit, when Eddie Valiant first drives through Toontown.

Mickey's Christmas Carol
Jiminy appeared in Mickey's Christmas Carol as the Ghost of Christmas Past. The badge is given to him by the Blue Fairy at the end of Pinocchio marking him as an official conscience now declares him to be the Ghost of Christmas Past. Scrooge is perplexed at his size, but Jiminy shoots back at him that if Scrooge were measured by his amount of kindness, "you'd be no bigger than a speck of dust!" Nevertheless, Jiminy shows him Scrooge's bygone Christmases: (Scrooge) while working at Fezziwig's, and putting his money before his love, whom he never saw again. When Scrooge begs the minuscule ghost to take him away from these bad memories, Jiminy reminds him that he "fashioned these memories" himself.

Other media

Disney children's records
Edwards (as Jiminy) performed the narration for several 78 RPM children's records. Two of them were Bongo (originally part of the animated feature Fun and Fancy Free) and The Littlest Outlaw. He also made some children's records simply as Cliff Edwards, including "Old MacDonald Had a Farm".

Comics
Jiminy appears in several comics, (first appearance in Mickey Mouse Magazine Vol. 5 No. 3 in 1939), such as various issues of Walt Disney's Comics and Stories, and he is featured on the covers of Four Color # 701, 795, 897 and 989.

Films and TV

Disney Sing-Along Songs

Jiminy Cricket hosted these five sing-along videos:
The Bare Necessities (October 13, 1987)
Very Merry Christmas Songs (November 15, 1988, transition cards only, before all songs)
Be Our Guest (June 19, 1992)
Friend Like Me (April 30, 1993)
Circle of Life (December 13, 1994; VHS version only)

Disney's House of Mouse

Jiminy Cricket is among the numerous Disney characters who appear in the television series House of Mouse; he also appears in the movie. He is most often sat on a table with Cri-Kee from Mulan. A running gag in the series involves Timon from The Lion King''' trying to eat him, and his rescue by Pumbaa.

Once Upon a Time
Jiminy (both in fairy-tale cricket form and as his "real world" human alias, Archie Hopper) is a core character on the Disney-owned ABC television series Once Upon a Time, played by Raphael Sbarge.  In the series, which finds cursed fairy tale characters living in present-day Maine without memory of their true origins, Jiminy/Archie serves as the town counselor and "conscience". He also has a dalmatian named Pongo. The series adds additional backstory for the character, portraying his life as the human son of con artists, who inadvertently causes the death of a couple after striking a deal with Rumplestiltskin; Rumplestiltskin gave Jiminy a potion to give to his parents to get them out of his life, but his parents realized what he had planned and switched the potion with an identical bottle that was given to the couple that his parents had targeted for their latest con. He is eventually turned into the ethical cricket from previous portrayals by the Blue Fairy. In his cricket form, he is charged to look after and guide the dead couple's son, Geppetto, as long as he lives.

The Wonderful World of Mickey Mouse

In "Disappearing Act", Jiminy (voiced once again by Joe Ochman) makes a cameo appearance alongside other Disney magical characters like the Fairy Godmother from Cinderella, Flora, Fauna, and Merriweather from Sleeping Beauty, Merlin from The Sword in the Stone, and the Blue Fairy, to help Mickey realize he had the magic inside him all along.

Live-Action remake

On October 25, 2019, it was reported that Disney is developing an undetermined animated project focused on Jiminy Cricket for its upcoming streaming service, Disney+. Joseph Gordon-Levitt voiced the character in the 2022 live-action adaptation of the film, which was released exclusively on Disney+.

Video games
Disney's Villains' Revenge
Jiminy Cricket is a main character in the game Disney's Villains' Revenge, wherein he must help the player save the stories of Dumbo, Alice in Wonderland, Peter Pan and Snow White and the Seven Dwarfs from the stories' respective villains: the Ringmaster, the Queen of Hearts, Captain Hook, and the Evil Queen.

Kingdom Hearts
He appears in the Kingdom Hearts video game series as the chronicler of player character Sora's travels, writing journals and keeping a cast list of the figures they meet, friend or foe. In the original Kingdom Hearts, he has some direct involvement with characters and elements based on the film Pinocchio. He has a substantially bigger part in the sequel, Kingdom Hearts: Chain of Memories, frequently talking to Sora and offering advice. His role in Kingdom Hearts II is smaller than in the first game; he only appears in one cutscene. He also appears in Kingdom Hearts Coded. A dream world version of Jiminy Cricket appears in Kingdom Hearts 3D: Dream Drop Distance; as it is a dream, those who are no longer in their world appear, either via travel or death. He returns in Kingdom Hearts III.

In the English releases he is voiced by Eddie Carroll for Kingdom Hearts, Kingdom Hearts II, and Kingdom Hearts Re:Chain of Memories, Phil Snyder for Kingdom Hearts Re:Coded and Kingdom Hearts 3D: Dream Drop Distance (following Carroll's death in 2010), and Joe Ochman for the HD cinematics of Re:Coded for Kingdom Hearts HD 2.5 Remix and Kingdom Hearts III (following Snyder's retirement in 2014). In the Japanese version, Jiminy was voiced by Kaneta Kimotsuki until his death in 2016 and by Yōhei Tadano since Kingdom Hearts III.

Disney Magic Kingdoms
Jiminy Cricket is a playable character in the mobile game Disney Magic Kingdoms. He is a limited time character, debuting during an event focused on Pinocchio.

Disney park appearances
Jiminy Cricket can be seen meeting and greeting guests from time to time in the Disney Parks, most prominently at Disney's Animal Kingdom at Rafiki's Planet Watch. His signature features the 'J' as an umbrella.

More recently, Cricket and the Blue Fairy are the hosts of the Wishes: A Magical Gathering of Disney Dreams fireworks display at the Magic Kingdom theme park.

Cricket also hosts the Nighttime parade, SpectroMagic In the Magic Kingdom (replaced in early 2010 for an updated version of the Main Street Electrical Parade).

He also appears daily in the "Disney Festival of Fantasy Parade" at Magic Kingdom in Florida.

He also appears as the pace of play ambassador at Walt Disney World Golf Resort in Florida.

International performers
Roger Carel (French)
Georg Thomalla (German, film)
Carlo Romano (Italian, film)
Masashi Ebara (Japanese, Pony Canyon edition of the film)
Kaneta Kimotsuki (Japanese, all other appearances until his death in 2016)
Yōhei Tadano (Japanese, Kingdom Hearts III'')
John Price (Danish, 1940 version of the film)
Ove Sprogøe (Danish, 1978 version of the film as well as "From all of us to all of you")
Pablo Palitos (Spanish in Latin America Version)

References

Walt Disney Animation Studios characters
Film characters introduced in 1940
Pinocchio characters
Fictional crickets
Fictional storytellers
Fictional artists
Film sidekicks
Pinocchio (1940 film)
Male characters in animation